SETN may refer to:

SET News, news channel of the Sanlih E-Television in Taiwan
Special Events Television Network, defunct syndicated television package
Colonel Carlos Concha Torres Airport, ICAO code SETN